Lotte Rotman (born 19 June 1999) is a Belgian professional racing cyclist. She signed to ride for the UCI Women's Team  for the 2019 women's road cycling season.

References

1999 births
Living people
Belgian female cyclists
Place of birth missing (living people)
21st-century Belgian women